Mijat (Cyrillic script: Мијат) is a masculine given name. It may refer to:

Mijat Gaćinović (born 1995), footballer
Mijat Marić (born 1984), footballer
Mijat Stojanović (1818–1881), ethnographer
Mijat Tomić (died 1656), hajduk

See also
Mijatović
Mijatovac

Croatian masculine given names
Serbian masculine given names
Slavic masculine given names